Nedjeljka "Neda" Klarić (born Mikulandra; 17 October 1954) is a Croatian lawyer and former politician who served as Mayor of Šibenik from 2004 to 2009, and was a member of the Croatian Parliament from 2008 to 2011.

Biography 
Born in the municipality of Bilice, she graduated from the Law Faculty at the University of Zagreb. Before she entered the politics she worked mostly as a lawyer.

Political career 
As a member of the conservative centre-right Croatian Democratic Union (HDZ), Klarić ran for the position of Mayor of Šibenik in the early elections for the Šibenik City Council which took place on 18 April 2004. As the HDZ won most seats in the city council, she took the duties of mayor on 16 May the same year. 

In the 2009 local election she lost in the second round to SDP-led coalition-candidate Ante Županović who became the next mayor. After that she withdraws from politics.

She also served as a member of the Croatian Parliament between January 2008 to December 2011, representing the 9th electoral district.

References 

Living people
1954 births
Women mayors of places in Croatia
Mayors of places in Croatia